James Gow (August 23, 1907 – February 11, 1952) was an American writer and a member of the League of American Writers, an organization created by the Communist Party.

Works
Tomorrow the World (1943)
Deep are the Roots (1945)
Legend of Sarah (1950)

References

1907 births
1952 deaths
20th-century American writers